Aquae Sulis (Latin for Waters of Sulis) was a small town in the Roman province of Britannia. Today it is the English city of Bath, Somerset. The Antonine Itinerary register of Roman roads lists the town as Aquis Sulis. Ptolemy records the town as Aquae calidae (warm waters) in his 2nd-century work Geographia.

Development

Baths and temple complex

The Romans probably began building a formal temple complex at Aquae Sulis in the AD 60s.  The Romans had probably arrived in the area shortly after their arrival in Britain in AD 43 and there is evidence that their military road, the Fosse Way, crossed the river Avon at Bath.  An early Roman military presence has been found just to the North-East of the bath complex in the Walcot area of modern Bath.  Not far from the crossing point of their road, they would have been attracted by the large natural hot spring which had been a shrine of the Celtic Brythons, dedicated to their goddess Sulis. This spring is a natural mineral spring found in the valley of the Avon River in Southwest England, it is the only spring in Britain officially designated as hot. The name is Latin for "the waters of Sulis." The Romans identified the goddess with their goddess Minerva and encouraged her worship. The similarities between Minerva and Sulis helped the Celts adapt to Roman culture. The spring was built up into a major Roman Baths complex associated with an adjoining temple. About 130 messages to Sulis scratched onto lead curse tablets (defixiones) have been recovered from the Sacred Spring by archaeologists. Most of them were written in Latin, although one discovered was in Brythonic; they usually laid curses upon those whom the writer felt had done them wrong. This collection is the most important found in Britain.

The Brythonic curse recovered on a metal pendant is the only sentence in the language that has been discovered.  It reads:
Adixoui Deuina Deieda Andagin Uindiorix cuamenai or maybe Adixoui Deiana Deieda Andagin Uindiorix cuamiun ai

The affixed – Deuina, Deieda, Andagin, (and) Uindiorix – I have bound

An alternative translation based on a translation of certain words as non-proper nouns is the following:
May I, Windiorix for/at Cuamena defeat (alt. summon to justice) the worthless woman, oh divine Deieda. (Alt. Divine Deiada, may I, Windiorix, bring to justice/defeat (in court) the woman at Cuamena.)

This is still an uncertain translation in that it takes into account the nominal cases of the nouns:

Windiorix (alt. Windorix) - nominative masculine (subject), lit. "fair-headed" (windo) "king" (rix); Dewina Deieda - nominative/vocative feminine "divine Deieda" (deiada "goddess"); Andagin - accusative feminine "woman"; "Cuamenai - locative/dative feminine of CuamenaGaius Julius Solinus remarks "The circumference of Britain is 4875 miles. In this space are many great rivers, and hot springs refined with opulent splendour for the use of mortal men. Minerva is the patroness of these springs. In her shrine, the perpetual fires never whiten into ashes. When they dwindle away, they change into stony globules."

Walled town

It was the religious settlement, rather than the road junction further north and the residential area now known as Walcot, which was given defensive stone walls, probably in the 3rd century. The area within - of approximately  - was largely open ground, but soon began to be filled in. There is some dispute as to whether these new buildings were private dwellings or were associated with servicing the pilgrims to the temple. There was also a ribbon development along the northern road outside the walls and cemeteries beyond.

Decline
From the later 3rd century on, the Western Roman Empire and its urban life declined. However, while the great suite of baths fell into disrepair, some use of the hot springs continued. After the end of Roman rule in Britain around AD 410, some residents seem to have remained, but violence seems to have taken root. Archaeological evidence of chaos and piratical raids on the few citizens who remained resident in the 440s include the finding of a young girl's severed head in an oven in Abbeygate Street during excavations in 1984/85.

As far back as Geoffrey of Monmouth, the Arthurian Battle of Mons Badonicus (c. 500) has been suggested to have taken place near Aquae Sulis. Tim and Annette Burkitt have proposed Caer Badden, some 20 miles northeast of the Roman mines at Charterhouse, on the basis of the Welsh Annals, as well as archaeological and toponymic evidence.Burkitt, Tim and Bennett, Annette, "Badon as Bath", Popular Archaeology, April 1985, Vol.6, No.6.

Medieval legend
In medieval times, the Roman temple at Bath was incorporated into British legend. The thermal springs at Bath were said to have been dedicated to Minerva by the legendary King Bladud and the temple there endowed with an eternal flame.

An 8th century poem in Old English, The Ruin'', describing the ruinous changes that had overtaken a Roman hot-water spring, is assumed to be a reference to Aquae Sulis. The poem was copied in the Exeter Book for transmission to future generations.

Remains

Rediscovered from the 18th century onward, the city's Roman remains have become one of Bath's main attractions. They may be viewed almost exclusively at the Roman Baths Museum, which houses:
Artefacts recovered from the Baths and the Roman town. There is a fine collection of stone sculptures.
Excavated remains of the main temple courtyard.
The Roman Baths themselves, though some lie below 18th century stonework. Of particular note is the original Roman Great Bath still lead-lined and fed by the sacred spring through Roman lead pipes.
A hoard of 30,000 silver coins, one of the largest discovered in Britain, was unearthed in an archaeological dig in 2012. The coins, believed to date from the 3rd century, were found not far away from the Roman baths.

See also
History of Bath, Somerset
Timeline of Bath, Somerset
Roman sites in Great Britain

References

History of Somerset
Archaeological sites in Somerset
Roman town of Bath
Roman religious sites in England
Roman towns and cities in England
Hot springs of the United Kingdom
1st-century establishments in Roman Britain